Jonas Bjerre Terkelsbøl (born 21 September 1976) is a musician and visual artist from Copenhagen, Denmark, best known as the lead singer of Danish rock band Mew. Bjerre creates animated videos for Mew's live shows.
He has an uncommon vocal range, above the average pitch, which has helped contribute to Mew's unique sound, and earned him a Danish Music Award for Danish Male Singer in 2006. He went to school at the international school of Bernadotteskolen and was a student of Aurehøj Amtsgymnasium.

Bjerre is also in a band called Apparatjik consisting of himself, Guy Berryman of Coldplay, Magne Furuholmen of A-ha and Martin Terefe. Apparatjik was originally formed to write and record a song for a charity album called Songs for Survival linked with the BBC Documentary called Amazon with Bruce Parry.  Their contribution to the album became the main theme for the television series. Since then, Apparatjik have expanded into the field of art, exhibiting visual arts and performing inside a glass cube at various galleries and art festivals. In 2010 they released the album We Are Here via their official website, and later, in June 2010, through iTunes.

In 2021 Jonas Bjerre announced a new collaboration with musician and producer Tobias Wilner called Tachys. They released their first single When The World Wakes Up in June 2021.

Bjerre has also appeared as a featured vocalist on songs by artists such as Duran Duran, Kimbra, Purity Ring, Blue Foundation, Silo, Molina, Future 3, RAC, Carly Paradis, and Kasper Winding.

Outside of band commitments, Bjerre has also recorded songs and written scores for films and television. In 2011, Bjerre composed the soundtrack for the movie Skyscraper by Rune Schjøtt. The music was released on the album Songs and Music from the Movie Skyscraper. In 2020 Jonas composed and recorded the music for the tv series Scandinavian Star and released the score as a soundtrack album. In 2021, Bjerre wrote and recorded music for the documentary film President about the 2018 presidential election in Zimbabwe, directed by Camilla Nielsson.

Bjerre has also directed music videos for artists A-ha, Agnes Obel, and Mew.

Albums

With Mew

1 The name in its entirety is: No More Stories / Are Told Today / I'm Sorry / They Washed Away // No More Stories / The World Is Grey / I'm Tired / Let's Wash Away.

With Apparatjik

As Jonas Bjerre, film composer 
 Vi Der Blev Tilbage (We Who Stayed Behind) (2008)
 Girl In The Water (2011)
 Bosporus (2011)
 Skyscraper - Skyskraber (2011)
 Scandinavian Star (2020)
 President (2022)

Other appearances

References

External links

 Mew official website
 Jonas Bjerre official website
 
 Apparatjik official website

1976 births
Living people
Danish rock guitarists
Danish rock singers
English-language singers from Denmark
21st-century Danish male  singers
21st-century guitarists
Apparatjik members
Singers from Copenhagen